1928 legislative elections can refer to:
 1928 Greek legislative election
 1928 French legislative election
 1928 Luxembourgian legislative election
 1928 Philippine legislative election
 1928 Polish legislative election